Fulmer is a village and civil parish in south Buckinghamshire, England. The village has, along most of its northern border, a narrow green buffer from Gerrards Cross and it's heavily wooded adjoining neighbouring villages of Iver Heath and Wexham. The village's name is derived from the Old English for "mere or lake frequented by birds". It was recorded in 1198 as Fugelmere.

In the late 17th century the owners of the manor of Fulmer were forced to sell their house to their servants because they had squandered their money and could not afford to pay them. The manor then passed into the hands of the Duke of Portland.

In the mid-19th century watercress was grown at Moor Farm, known locally as "The Bog", (now Low Farm) by Richard Whiting Bradbery, the son of William Bradbery, the first British watercress pioneer who had a large cress farm at West Hyde, Hertfordshire. Richard is buried in St James churchyard, Fulmer, with his wife Hannah.

Fulmer Chase on Stoke Common Road is a former home of the Wills tobacco family and was used as a military hospital during World War II.

Fulmer is close to Pinewood Studios and several films have been shot in the village, including Those Magnificent Men in their Flying Machines and Sleepy Hollow.

Demography

Notable people
Marmaduke Darrell
Tess Daly
Vernon Kay
J. Peter Robinson (was born here)
Michael York (actor) (was born here)
Yasser Al-Habib
John Sulston (was born here)
Angelina Jolie (lived here) 
David Newbery (was born here)

Sport and recreation
King George's Field is a playing field that was named in memorial to King George V.

Fulmer Cricket Club play friendly matches at King George's Field. A local village team has existed since 1886 but the current club was officially founded in 1895. Local resident and noted cricketer Denis Compton opened the new clubhouse in 1988.

References

External links

http://www.fulmervillage.org

Villages in Buckinghamshire
Civil parishes in Buckinghamshire